Vasilyevka is a rural locality (a selo) and the administrative center of Vasilyevskoye Rural Settlement, Oktyabrsky District, Volgograd Oblast, Russia. The population was 411 as of 2010. There are 11 streets.

Geography 
The village is located on Yergeni, on the Myshkova River, 190 km from Volgograd, 34 km from Oktyabrsky.

References 

Rural localities in Oktyabrsky District, Volgograd Oblast